Ekaterina Guliyeva (née Zavyalova, divorced Poistogova; born 1 March 1991) is a Russian-born track and field athlete who specializes in the 800 metres and competes for Turkey.

Career
In the 800 meters event at the 2012 Summer Olympics, Guliyeva placed second in her first-round heat with a time of 2:01.08. She then placed second in the semifinals with a time of 1:59.45. She won the bronze medal that day in the 800 m final with a time of 1:57.53 behind fellow Russian Mariya Savinova (1:56.19) and Caster Semenya of South Africa (1:57.23).

In November 2015, after an investigation that completed that year, Guliyeva (along with four other Russian runners) was recommended by the World Anti-Doping Agency to receive a retroactive lifetime ban for doping during the 2012 Olympics. On 7 April 2017, CAS refused to backdate disqualification as far back as 2012, and disqualified Guliyeva from 2015. Her 2012 Olympic bronze medal was upgraded to silver after countrywoman Mariya Savinova's lifetime ban from competition due to doping, which annulled all of Savinova's results backdating to July 2010 and stripped Savinova's 2012 Olympic gold medal.

Personal life
Zavyalova was born in Arzamas. After marrying fellow middle-distance runner Stepan Poistogov, she adopted the feminine form of his surname, Poistogova. She returned to her birth name following their divorce. In 2019, Zavyalova married sprinter Ramil Guliyev, and she gave birth to their daughter the following year.

International competitions

See also
List of doping cases in athletics
List of Olympic medalists in athletics (women)
List of 2012 Summer Olympics medal winners
Doping at the Olympic Games
800 metres at the Olympics

References

1991 births
Living people
Sportspeople from Nizhny Novgorod
Russian female middle-distance runners
Olympic female middle-distance runners
Olympic athletes of Russia
Olympic silver medalists for Russia
Olympic silver medalists in athletics (track and field)
Athletes (track and field) at the 2012 Summer Olympics
Medalists at the 2012 Summer Olympics
World Athletics Championships athletes for Russia
Russian sportspeople in doping cases
Doping cases in athletics
Athletes (track and field) at the 2022 Mediterranean Games
Mediterranean Games gold medalists in athletics
Mediterranean Games gold medalists for Turkey
Mediterranean Games bronze medalists for Turkey
Turkish female middle-distance runners
Islamic Solidarity Games medalists in athletics
Turkish people of Russian descent
Russian emigrants to Turkey